Robert Jurasin (born August 26, 1964) is a former defensive lineman for the Saskatchewan Roughriders from 1986–1997 and the Toronto Argonauts in 1998. He was a CFL All-Star in 1987, 1988, 1992 and 1997. He was a part of the Roughriders 1989 Grey Cup winning team.  He also won the Molson Cup Most Popular Player in 1987 and 1997.

Jurasin is the Roughriders all-time leader in quarterback sacks with 142.

Jurasin also played in the Arena Football League with the Iowa Barnstormers. A neck injury in the AFL forced Jurasin into retirement. 

After retiring as a player, he was a Defensive Line and Strength Conditioning coach at Northern Michigan University for six years and has been a guest coach at the University of Saskatchewan in Saskatoon.

He was honoured by being inducted in the Northern Michigan University Hall of Fame in 1998 and the U.P. Sports Hall of Fame in 2005.  Jurasin was inducted into the Canadian Football Hall of Fame in 2006.

In addition to his playing accomplishments, one of Jurasin's enduring legacies is the red and black Rising Sun bandana he always wore under his helmet. A green and white version of the bandana became a popular CFL merchandise item, sold to Roughriders fans long after Jurasin's departure from the team, and even to the present day.

External links
Just Sports Stats
CFLapedia bio
CFL.ca profile
AFL stats

1964 births
Living people
American players of Canadian football
Canadian football defensive linemen
Canadian Football Hall of Fame inductees
Iowa Barnstormers players
Northern Michigan Wildcats football players
People from Wakefield, Michigan
Players of American football from Michigan
Saskatchewan Roughriders players
Toronto Argonauts players
American football defensive linemen